The Cape Cod Canal is an artificial waterway in the U.S. state of Massachusetts connecting Cape Cod Bay in the north to Buzzards Bay in the south, and is part of the Atlantic Intracoastal Waterway. The approximately  canal traverses the neck of land joining Cape Cod to the state's mainland.

Most of the canal is located in the town of Bourne, but its northeastern terminus is in Sandwich. Scusset Beach State Reservation lies near the canal's north entrance, and the Massachusetts Maritime Academy is near its south. A swift-running current changes direction every six hours and can reach  during the receding ebb tide. The waterway is maintained by the United States Army Corps of Engineers and has no toll fees. It is spanned by the Cape Cod Canal Railroad Bridge, the Bourne Bridge, and the Sagamore Bridge.

The canal is occasionally used by whales and dolphins, including endangered North Atlantic right whales; these can cause closure of the canal.

History

Construction of a canal was first considered by Myles Standish of the Plymouth Colony in 1623, and the Pilgrims scouted the low-lying stretch of land between the Manomet and Scusset rivers for potential routes. William Bradford established the Aptucxet Trading Post in 1627 at the portage between the rivers. Trade prospered with the American Indians of Narragansett Bay and the Dutch of New Netherland, and this was a major factor enabling the Pilgrims to pay off their indebtedness. In 1697, the General Court of Massachusetts considered the first formal proposal to build the canal but took no action. In 1717, a canal was created in Orleans, Massachusetts called Jeremiah's Gutter which spanned a narrower portion of the Cape some distance to the east, but it only remained active until the late 1800s. More energetic planning with surveys took place repeatedly in 1776 (by George Washington), 1791, 1803, 1818, 1824–1830, and 1860. None of these efforts came to fruition.

The first attempts at actually building a canal did not take place until the late 19th century; earlier planners either ran out of money or were overwhelmed by the project's size. The engineers finally decided which route to take through the hillsides by connecting and widening the Manomet and Scusset Rivers. The first actual excavation began in 1880, when the Cape Cod Ship Canal Company hired 400 immigrant Italian laborers to begin digging with shovels and wheelbarrows. The effort ran out of money almost immediately, and the laborers were unpaid and forced to beg for food in Sandwich. In 1883, the Cape Cod Ship Canal Company reorganized. Under engineer Frederick Lockwood, the company used a bucket dredge to clear nearly a mile of channel through the Sandwich marshes, before shutting down in 1891.

Private construction

On June 22, 1909, construction finally began for a working canal under the direction of August Belmont Jr.'s Boston, Cape Cod & New York Canal Company using designs by engineer William Barclay Parsons. The canal engineers encountered many problems, such as huge boulders underwater (much of Cape Cod is a moraine—see geology of Cape Cod). Divers were hired to blow them up, but the effort slowed dredging. Another problem was cold winter storms which forced the engineers to stop dredging altogether and wait for spring. Nevertheless, the canal opened on a limited basis on July 29, 1914, and it was completed in 1916. Several accidents occurred due to the narrow channel and navigation difficulty, and these limited traffic and tarnished the canal's reputation.

Public takeover and expansion

The Director General of the United States Railroad Administration took over jurisdiction and operation of the canal four days later under a presidential proclamation. As a result, it became the widest sea-level canal of its time. The southern entrance to the canal was rebuilt for direct access from Buzzards Bay rather than through Phinney Harbor. Before construction began, the Massachusetts Institute of Technology built a huge scale model of the canal (9 feet to a mile, roughly  actual size) to study the hydraulic effects of tidal currents on the enlarged and rerouted canal.

World War II
During World War II, shipping again used the canal to avoid U-boats patrolling offshore. It was protected by coastal artillery batteries at the Sagamore Hill Military Reservation at the northern entrance and the Butler Point Military Reservation at the southern entrance. The artillery was never fired in defense of the canal.

The Mystic Steamship Company's collier SS Stephen R. Jones was grounded and sank in the canal on June 28, 1942. Shipping was routed around Cape Cod, and one diverted ship, the Liberty ship SS Alexander Macomb, was torpedoed by the German submarine U-215 on July 3 with the loss of 10 lives. The canal reopened on July 31 after the wrecked Stephen R. Jones was removed with the help of 17 tons of dynamite.

Recreational uses
The canal is used extensively by recreational and commercial vessels. Service roads on both sides of the canal provide access for fishing and are heavily used by in-line skaters, bicyclists, and walkers. Several parking areas are maintained at access points. Bourne Scenic Park is leased by the Corps of Engineers to the Town of Bourne Recreation Authority for use as a tent and RV campground adjacent to the Canal.

The Army Corps of Engineers maintains the Cape Cod Canal Visitor Center which introduces visitors to the history, features, and operation of the canal. Features include a retired  US Army Corps of Engineers patrol boat, a 46-seat theater showing continuous DVD presentations on canal history, canal flora and fauna, real time radar and camera images of the waterway, and a variety of interactive exhibits. Corps Park Rangers staff the center and provide free public programs on a variety of subjects. The Visitor Center is open seasonally from May to October, and admission is free. It is located on Moffitt Drive in Sandwich near the canal's east end. A second seasonally staffed center is at the Herring Run along Scenic Highway.

Scusset Beach State Reservation lies just north of the east end of the canal and offers beach facilities as well as tent and RV camping. A  trail there leads to Sagamore Hill, once an Indian meeting ground and the site of a World War II coastal fortification. Bournedale Hills Trail extends  along the north side of the Canal from Bourne Scenic Park campground to the Herring Run. The trail includes a  self-guided loop which interprets the Canal's historic and natural features.

Tunnel folklore and proposal
A spoof became popular during the late 20th century concerning a fictitious road tunnel, allegedly built in the 1960s, under the Cape Cod Canal. It came into popular usage in Massachusetts as a commentary on the severe traffic entering and exiting Cape Cod during the summer months. Since 1994, decals have been sold in shops around the Cape as popular souvenirs purporting to be "permits" allowing the bearer to use the tunnel; the popularity of these "permits" briefly led to a lawsuit among several different sellers. In 2019, the Massachusetts Department of Transportation (MassDOT) indicated that it had studied the idea of adding a tunnel to help alleviate traffic, but due to findings it would not presently consider moving forward.

Gallery

See also 
 List of crossings of the Cape Cod Canal

References

Further reading

External links

Video clips of ships transiting Cape Cod Canal

 
Intracoastal Waterway
Historic Civil Engineering Landmarks
Canals opened in 1914
1914 establishments in Massachusetts
Ship canals
Water transportation in Massachusetts
Canals in Massachusetts
Bodies of water of Barnstable County, Massachusetts
Bourne, Massachusetts
Sandwich, Massachusetts
Belmont family
Transportation buildings and structures in Barnstable County, Massachusetts
Tourist attractions in Barnstable County, Massachusetts
United States Army Corps of Engineers
Massachusetts culture